The 1943 Rice Owls football team was an American football team that represented Rice University as a member of the Southwest Conference (SWC) during the 1943 college football season. In its fourth season under head coach Jess Neely, the team compiled a 3–7 record (2–3 against SWC opponents) and was outscored by a total of 183 to 60.

Schedule

References

Rice
Rice Owls football seasons
Rice Owls football